Max Q were an Australian band formed in 1989. Playing electronic music, the band was a collaboration between Michael Hutchence of INXS and Ollie Olsen (Whirlywirld, Dogs in Space soundtrack).

Biography
Max Q consisted of Hutchence (vocals and songwriting) and Olsen (songwriting and production), who were accompanied by key members of the post-punk scene in Melbourne, Australia; most of whom had previously collaborated with Olsen. The project followed on from Hutchence and Olsen's work on the film, Dogs in Space, where they had first met.

Max Q released its sole self-titled album in 1989 and had minor hits with the songs "Way of the World" and "Sometimes".  The album was certified gold in Australia, and was the 93rd highest-selling album of 1989 in Australia. Max Q was less successful in other countries.  The album is no longer in print and has never been re-issued. The band never performed any live shows.

In 2019, INXS' manager Chris Murphy said he would love to reissue the Max Q album, but that legal issues were not yet resolved.

Name
While the project was named after Ollie Olsen's dog Max, max q is also an aerospace term referring to the point at which the dynamic pressure (q) on a launch vehicle is greatest. Consequently, there is another band called Max Q, which consists of astronauts assigned to the Johnson Space Center in Houston, Texas.

Band members
In a 1989 interview (? Hutchence died in Nov 1997 ?), Hutchence revealed his perspective on the Max Q musicians:

Ollie isn't supposed to hang around with pop stars and I'm not supposed to hang around with punk types. The band is made up of rowdy friends from Melbourne. These guys are good musicians who've never had a chance. Most of them have never even been in a studio. These are real underground people who don't have any money. Some of them have never been on a plane before. They were worried that working with me, they'd lose their underground status.

 Michael Hutchence – vocals, songwriting (died 1997)
 Ollie Olsen – production, songwriting
 Arne Hanna – guitar
 Michael Sheridan – guitar, feedback
 Bill McDonald – bass guitar
 Gus Till – piano, MIDI programming
 John Murphy – drums, percussion, trumpet, screams (died 2015)

Additional musicians
 Peggy Harley – backing vocals
 Marie Hoy – backing vocals ("Soul Engine")
 Pat Powell – backing vocals ("Bucket Head")
 Pam Ross – narration
 Recorded at Rhino Studios, Darlinghurst
 Paula (Peej) Jones – engineer

Discography

Albums

Singles

ARIA Awards

|-
| rowspan="3"| ARIA Music Awards of 1990
| rowspan="2"| "Way of the World"
| ARIA Award for Breakthrough Artist – Single
| 
|-
| ARIA Award for Single of the Year
| 
|-
| Max Q
| ARIA Award for Breakthrough Artist – Album
|

References

External links
 The Complete Official Michael Hutchence website
 Michael Hutchence fan site on Max Q
 Michael Hutchence Fan Forum

Musical groups from Melbourne
Australian rock music groups
Michael Hutchence
Australian synthpop groups
1989 establishments in Australia
1990 disestablishments in Australia
Musical groups established in 1989
Musical groups disestablished in 1990
Atlantic Records artists
CBS Records artists
Mercury Records artists